Jacob Romeis (December 1, 1835March 8, 1904) was an American businessman and politician who served two terms as a U.S. Representative from Ohio from 1885 to 1889.

Biography 
Born in Weisenbach, Bavaria in the German Confederation, Romeis attended the village schools. He immigrated in 1847 to the United States with his parents, who settled in Erie County, New York, and attended the public and select schools of Buffalo, New York. He engaged in the shipping business and railroading. He moved to Toledo, Ohio, in 1856.

Romeis was elected to the board of aldermen of the city of Toledo in 1874. He was reelected in 1876 and served as president of the board in 1877. He served as mayor of Toledo from 1879 to 1885.

Romeis was elected as a Republican to the Forty-ninth and Fiftieth Congresses (March 4, 1885 - March 3, 1889). He was an unsuccessful candidate for reelection in 1888 to the Fifty-first Congress. He later engaged in fruit growing near Toledo.

He died in Toledo, Ohio on March 8, 1904. He was interred in Woodlawn Cemetery.

References

External links 

1835 births
1904 deaths
German emigrants to the United States
Mayors of Toledo, Ohio
19th-century American politicians
Republican Party members of the United States House of Representatives from Ohio